Siphoneugena occidentalis is a species of plant in the family Myrtaceae. It is found in Argentina and Bolivia. It is threatened by habitat loss.

References

occidentalis
Vulnerable plants
Taxonomy articles created by Polbot
Taxobox binomials not recognized by IUCN